St Petrock's Church in Parracombe, Devon, England was built in the 13th century. It is recorded in the National Heritage List for England as a designated Grade I listed building, and is now a redundant church in the care of the Churches Conservation Trust.  It was declared redundant on 25 November 1969, and was vested in the Trust on 23 June 1971.

The church is dedicated to St Petrock. Parts of the building, including the chancel and the lower part of the tower remain from the 13th century but much of the current fabric dates from a reconstruction in the early 16th century.

In 1879 there were worries about the stability of the building however protests led by John Ruskin who donated £10 lead to the preservation of the church and the construction of a new one further west in the village.

The interior includes 18th-century box pews, a Georgian pulpit and a screen with a wooden tympanum above it which dates from the 18th century.

Gallery

See also
 List of churches preserved by the Churches Conservation Trust in South West England

References

13th-century church buildings in England
Church of England church buildings in Devon
Grade I listed churches in Devon
Churches preserved by the Churches Conservation Trust
Churches dedicated to St Petroc